Patania symphonodes is a moth in the family Crambidae. It was described by Turner in 1913. It is found in Australia, where it has been recorded from Queensland.

The wings are translucent brown with wiggly brown lines.

References

Moths described in 1913
Spilomelinae